The Fifth constituency for French residents overseas (cinquième circonscription des Français établis hors de France) is one of eleven constituencies each electing one representative of French citizens overseas to the French National Assembly.

This constituency elected its first ever representative at the 2012 French legislative election - Arnaud Leroy of the Socialist Party.

The election of Samantha Cazebonne of LREM in 2017 was invalidated by
the Constitutional Council.  Cazebonne was elected at the
subsequent by-election.

Area
This constituency covers four countries: Portugal, Spain, Andorra and Monaco. As of New Year's Day 2011, it contained 116,196 registered French voters. The bulk of these, 89,391, were living in Spain, while 15,049 were living in Portugal, 8,302 in Monaco (a microstate which has a border only with France), and 3,454 in Andorra (a microstate, between Spain and France, of which the President of France is ex officio Co-Prince).

Deputies

Election results

2022 

 
 
 
 
|-
| colspan="8" bgcolor="#E9E9E9"|
|-
 

 
 
 
 
 * LREM dissident

2018 by-election

2017

2012

Candidates
The list of candidates was officially finalised on 14 May. There were thirteen candidates:

The Union for a Popular Movement initially chose Minister of Industry Éric Besson as its candidate. A former Socialist MP, Besson joined the UMP in 2007 and was appointed to President Nicolas Sarkozy's government. In December 2011, however, the party announced that Laurence Sailliet, its national secretary for the Iberian peninsula, would be its candidate. Francis Huss was her deputy (suppléant).

The Socialist Party chose Arnaud Leroy, a resident of Lisbon. He worked for the European Maritime Safety Agency, as an expert on environmental protection and climate change. Formerly a member of The Greens, he joined the Socialist Party, stating that political ecology should become a central issue in the renovation of social-democratic ideas. His deputy (suppléante) was Soledad Margareto, a resident of Madrid.

Juliette Estivil, originally from Spain and a member of the Left Party, was the chosen candidate of the Left Front, which also included the French Communist Party. She was a teacher of Spanish. Her deputy (suppléant) was Bruno Fialho.

Europe Écologie–The Greens chose Carolina Punset, with Stéphane Etcheverry as her deputy (suppléant). A resident of Altea, in Spain, Punset was a municipal councillor in her home town.

The National Front chose Alain Lavarde, with Jacques Struzynski as his deputy (suppléant).

The centre-right Radical Party and the centrist Republican, Ecologist and Social Alliance jointly chose Richard Onses, a resident of Barcelona, as their candidate. He was also a member of the centre-right Catalan party Convergence and Union. Guy-Michel Sembres was his deputy (suppléant).

The Radical Party of the Left chose Muriel Guenoux, with Stéphane Grandpierre as her deputy (suppléant).

Jean-Bastien Urfels, a resident of Spain working as headmaster in a French school, was the candidate endorsed by Arise the Republic. Norman Ledoux  was his deputy (suppléant).

Solidarity and Progress, the French branch of the LaRouche movement, was represented by Sébastien Drochon, with Karim Bakouri as his deputy (suppléant).

The Liberal Democratic Party chose Sophie Levamis. A resident of Hendaye, in the French Pyrenees, she argued that expatriates should choose a candidate who lived in France and would thus be "independent from every country" in their constituency. Jan Laarman was her deputy (suppléant).

Prince Charles Philippe, Duke of Anjou, grandson of Henri, Count of Paris (the Orléanist claimant to the throne of France until his death), stood (under the name Charles-Philippe d'Orléans) as an independent candidate, with the expressed hope of joining a "recomposed centre-right party" after the election. He was a resident of Portugal, and former resident of Spain. Sylvie Gourgeon was his deputy (suppléante).

Bernard Soulier, an economist and resident of Madrid, stood as an independent candidate. Pascale Lagneaux was his deputy (suppléante).

Catherine N'Guyen Thi Minh was an independent candidate, with Michel Rioche as her deputy.

Results
As in other constituencies, turnout in the first round was low: 19.5% in Portugal, 20% in Monaco, 20.5% in Spain, and 22.1% in Andorra. The result was the closest of any of the eleven expatriate constituencies, with UMP candidate Laurence Sailliet taking a 1.33% lead (217 votes). She finished first in Andorra and Monaco, while her Socialist rival Arnaud Leroy was first in Spain and Portugal. (Leroy was only third in Monaco, behind National Front candidate Alain Lavarde.) Juliette Estivil obtained the Left Front's joint best result abroad (fourth with 8.61%), matched by Raquel Garrido in the first constituency. Charles-Philippe d'Orléans obtained only 3% of the vote overall, but did finish fourth in Portugal, his country of residence, with 7.37%, and fourth also in Monaco, with 5.33%.

References

5